Falcon Safety Products, Inc. is a manufacturer of gas dusters (Dust-Off), horns, computer related cleaning supplies and gaming accessories. The company operates in the United States and the United Kingdom, with its headquarters in Branchburg, New Jersey. The company was founded in 1953.

Key Executives

 Phil Lapin – Chief Executive Officer and President
 Greg Mas- Executive Vice President – Finance, Operations & International Sales
 Michael Genner – Sales Director of Falcon UK 
 Steve Smith- Vice President of Sales
 Jen Rappaport- Marketing Manager

References

External links
Company website

Cleaning products